Major General Colin Richard James Weir,  (born 2 March 1971) is a senior British Army officer.

Early life and education
Weir was born on 2 March 1971 in Portadown, Northern Ireland. He was educated at Portadown College, and graduated from Queen's University Belfast with a Bachelor of Arts degree in History.

Military career
Weir was commissioned into the Royal Irish Rangers on 26 May 1991. He was appointed commanding officer of the 1st Battalion of the Royal Irish Regiment in March 2010 and was deployed in that role to Afghanistan. He went on to be Chief of Staff for 1st (United Kingdom) Division in December 2012, Commander of 16 Air Assault Brigade in July 2015, and Assistant Chief of Staff (Operations) at Permanent Joint Headquarters in May 2017 before becoming General Officer Commanding 1st (United Kingdom) Division in November 2018. Weir will move on to be Chief of Staff to the Field Army.

Weir was appointed a Member of the Order of the British Empire in the 2010 New Year Honours, and was awarded the Distinguished Service Order for service in Afghanistan on 30 September 2011.

References

1971 births
Living people
People educated at Portadown College
Alumni of Queen's University Belfast
British Army generals
Companions of the Distinguished Service Order
Members of the Order of the British Empire
People from Portadown